John Fahey may refer to:
 Jock Fahey (1911–1936), Australian rules footballer and coach
 Jackie Fahey (1928–2019), Irish politician
 John Fahey (musician) (1939–2001), American guitarist and composer
 John Fahey (equestrian) (born 1943), Australian Olympic equestrian
 John Fahey (politician) (1945–2020), Australian politician and president of the World Anti-Doping Agency
 John M. Fahey Jr. (fl. 1990s–2010s), CEO and president of the National Geographic Society

See also
 John Fahy (disambiguation)
 John Fare, called John Fahey in some accounts